13 is the second extended play (EP) by American rapper Denzel Curry, released on June 26, 2017, by PH Recordings and Loma Vista Recordings. The EP features guest appearances by Ronny J and Lil Ugly Mane. It also features production by FNZ, Eric Dingus, Vae Cortez, and Ronny J, among others.

The EP serves as a prelude to his third studio album, Ta13oo, released in July 2018.

Background
In a press statement, Curry explained the meaning behind the numerical title and the EP's theme by saying,

In an interview with XXL, Curry explained the EP's sudden release, by stating,

Singles
The EP was supported by three promotional singles: "Equalizer" featuring Ronny J, "Hate Government", and "Zeltron 6 Billion" featuring Lil Ugly Mane.

Track listing
Credits adapted from album's liner notes.

Personnel
Credits adapted from album's liner notes.

Technical
 Nate Burgess - recording , mixing

References

2017 EPs
Denzel Curry albums
Albums produced by Ronny J